What's Up Doods? is a late night talk show hosted by veteran TV host/actor Edu Manzano produced by the TV5 Entertainment Group in cooperation with Tentra, Inc. and it is aired every Saturday at 9:00 pm (UTC +8 21:00) on TV5.

Launched on September 14, 2013, What's Up Doods? is one of the 8 newly launched weekend programs under the "Weekend Do It Better" block of the network.

The show ends its Season 1 last December 21, 2013 with the episode feature some of the interviews from prominent personalities on the show.

Segments
Kaya Mo Doods?
VidJoker
Praisebook
Bwitter

See also
TV5
List of programs broadcast by The 5 Network
List of Philippine television shows

External links
What's Up Doods? Website

References

TV5 (Philippine TV network) original programming
2013 Philippine television series debuts
2013 Philippine television series endings
Philippine television talk shows
Filipino-language television shows